Time Flies... 1994–2009 is a compilation album by English rock band Oasis. Released on 14 June 2010 by Big Brother Recordings, the album contains all 27 UK singles released by the band between 1994 and 2009, including "Whatever" and "Lord Don't Slow Me Down", which had previously never appeared on an Oasis studio album. "Sunday Morning Call" is not listed anywhere on the artwork but appears as a hidden track on track 14 of the second disc.

Five different versions of the album were released, the two-disc CD version, DVD, the deluxe box set, five-LP box set and the iTunes deluxe edition. A box set featuring postcards of the sleeves of every UK Oasis single was released concurrently with the album.

In Japan, Time Flies entered the charts at number 2, with first-week sales of 59,348 copies; while in the United Kingdom, it entered the charts at number 1, with first-week sales of 101,297. It was the 900th album ever to top the UK Albums Chart. It has been certified 5× platinum in the UK with equivalent 1.5 million sales.

Critical reception 

Time Flies... 1994–2009 received generally positive reviews from music critics upon its release. At Metacritic, which assigns a normalised score out of 100 to ratings from publications, the album received a mean score of 76 based on 11 reviews, indicating "generally favourable reviews".

Track listing

 "Champagne Supernova" is listed first track on Disc 2 of United States And Canada version. The United States And Canada version does not contain "Sunday Morning Call" as a hidden track due to time limitations.

Disc 3: DVD
The DVD includes all the music videos from "Supersonic" to "Falling Down", and in addition, previous unreleased live video versions of "Gas Panic!" and "Little by Little". Also included is commentary on the music videos by both Noel and Liam Gallagher.

Two iTunes Live Festival videos of "Half the World Away" and "Slide Away" are only available with the iTunes Deluxe Edition.

Disc 4: iTunes Live: London Festival

Notes
 All tracks recorded live at the iTunes Festival in the London Roundhouse in Chalk Farm, Camden Town, London, England in 2009.
 Tracks 1, 7, 12 and 20 are only available with the iTunes Deluxe Edition.
 Tracks 5, 8, 10, 16 and 17 were previously released as part of the iTunes Live: London Festival '09 EP.

Charts

Weekly charts

Year-end charts

Decade-end charts

Certifications and sales

References

External links

Time Flies... 1994–2009 at YouTube (streamed copy where licensed)

2010 compilation albums
Oasis (band) compilation albums
Big Brother Recordings compilation albums
Albums produced by Owen Morris
Albums produced by Dave Sardy